The Battlefield is a Hong Kong television series loosely based on the events in the Chu–Han Contention, an interregnum between the fall of the Qin dynasty and the founding of the Han dynasty. It was first broadcast in 1985 in Hong Kong on TVB Jade.
in 2004, The Conqueror's Story was 1st airing of the sequel.

Plot
Two heroes emerged in the final years of the Qin dynasty. They are Lau Bong and Hung Yu. Both of them were initially close friends, but later became rivals in a power struggle for supremacy over China historically known as the Chu–Han Contention.

Hon Sun meets Cheung Leung by coincidence and they strike up a friendship. Hon Sun remains on Hung Yu's side while Cheung Leung decides to serve Lau Bong. Not long later, Hon Sun leaves Hung Yu and is introduced to Lau Bong by Siu Ho. Hon Sun and Cheung Leung work together to help Lau Bong achieve his dream of ruling China.

Yuk Dip-yee is a former imperial spy who was sent to assassinate Hung Yu. However, she falls in love with Hung Yu and is unable to bring herself to kill him. She eventually dies at the hands of Hung Yu's uncle, Hung Leung. Subsequently, a beauty called Consort Yu appears and becomes the subject of a love rivalry between Hung Yu and Lau Bong. Hung Yu eventually wins Consort Yu's heart. In anger, Lau Bong marries Lui Chi, intending to use her father to help him deal with Hung Yu. This marks the beginning of the war between Lau Bong and Hung Yu.

Cast
 Note: Some of the characters' names are in Cantonese romanisation.

 Shek Sau as Hung Yu
 Lawrence Ng as Lau Bong
 Idy Chan as Consort Yu
 Kiki Sheung as Lui Chi
 Paul Chun as Hung Leung
 Austin Wai as Hon Sun
 Newton Lai as Cheung Leung
 Lau Kong as Siu Ho
 Barbara Yung as Yuk Dip-yee
 Lau Siu-ming as Chiu Ko
 Lam Tin as Lei See
 Lung Tin-sang as Wu-hoi
 Jimmy Wong as Tze-ying
 Lau Suk-yee as Keung Lan
 Ng Man-tat as Lui Chi's father

new remaking
Adam Cheng roled as new lau bong at age of 35 in a new remaking TV series.
many roles and casts are new generation to remake a new sequel in 2004.

External links

1985 Hong Kong television series debuts
1985 Hong Kong television series endings
TVB dramas
Television series set in the Western Han dynasty
Television series set in the Qin dynasty
Cantonese-language television shows